Józef Piłsudski Institute can refer to:
 Józef Piłsudski Institute of America, New York
 Józef Piłsudski Institute for Research in Modern History of Poland, Warsaw (1923-1939)
 Józef Piłsudski Institute in London